Nosferatu: Plague of Terror was a four-part comic series released by American publisher Millennium Publications in 1991–1992. Conceived as both a prequel and sequel to F.W. Murnau's silent film Nosferatu: A Symphony of Horror, it was written by Mark Ellis, designed by Melissa Martin, with art provided by Rik Levins, Richard Pace, and Frank Turner. The storyline presented a more complete story of Graf Orlok, the Nosferatu, separate and distinct from the Dracula legend.

Plot
Returning from the Crusades in the eleventh century, English knight Sir William Longsword stops at Orlok's castle in Transylvania, Romania, and finds the nuns dead or dying of plague. Longsword's squire, seeking treasure, inadvertently frees Orlok who kills the man. He bites Longsword but does not turn him into a vampire— rather, he becomes immortal for reasons known only to Orlok. The series tracks Orlok throughout history as he perpetuates his evil, instigating wars and bringing down plagues. Longsword tracks him through 19th century India and the madness of the Vietnam War and finally catches up to him in an abandoned cathedral in contemporary Brooklyn.

The final chapter ends in a conflagration in which both Orlok and Longsword are killed but the curse of the Nosferatu is passed onto an innocent, as it was to Longsword ten centuries before. The series was notable for presenting a vampire character drawn from European folklore rather than the refined Anne Rice model that was in vogue at the time.

A Nosferatu: Plague of Terror compilation in graphic novel format was released by Millennial Concepts in October 2009.

Reception and influence
This work was included in J. Gordon Melton’s reference work, The Vampire Gallery.

External links 
 Official website of Mark Ellis
 Comicspace.com
 Mark Ellis interviewed
 Press release announcing Millennial Concepts & Transfuzion are joining forces (July 9, 2008)

American comics
Vampires in comics
Nosferatu
Horror comics
1991 comics debuts
1992 comics endings
Comics based on films
Comics set in the 11th century
Comics set in the Middle Ages
Comics set in Romania
Fiction about immortality